Stig Rossen (born 14 June 1962) is a Danish singer and actor. He is known for his roles in musicals, especially playing Valjean in Les Misérables. He has also participated in Melodi Grand Prix, the Danish prelude to the Eurovision Song Contest. Rossen is known in Denmark for his Disney voice over.

References

External links
Stig Rossen's website in English

1962 births
Living people
Danish male singers
Danish male actors
Male actors from Copenhagen